Tad or TAD may refer to:

Places
 Tad, West Virginia, an unincorporated community
 Tad City, Texas, a coastal unincorporated community located on Olsovsky Road (Suburb of Ganado)
 Tad, Isfahan, a village in Isfahan Province, Iran
 Tad, Markazi, a village in Markazi Province, Iran

People and fictional characters
 Tad (given name)

Sports 

 Tadamon Sour SC, a Lebanese association football club

TAD
 TAD Disability Services, an Australian charity
 Technical Audio Devices, a brand of speakers by Pioneer Corporation
 Telephone answering device, alternate term for an Answering machine
 Technology aware design, a project of IMEC, a Belgian electronics company
 Tax-allocation district, alternate term for a tax increment financing area
 The Anglican Digest, a religious magazine in the United States 
 Temporary additional duty, a form of Temporary duty assignment in the US Navy and US Marines
 Thoracic aortic dissection, breakdown of the aorta in the chest
 Topologically associating domain, in genetics a DNA region with parts that interact with each other

Other uses
 Tad (band), a Seattle band
 TAD Corporation, a Japanese manufacturer of video arcade games
 ISO 639-3 code for the Tause language, spoken by 350 people in Papua
 Initials of Terry A. Davis (1969 - 2018), American computer programmer
 A tad, colloquial or ironic for 'a small amount'

See also
 TADS (Text Adventure Development System)